On Your Feet is the first album by the Christian rock band Spoken. Released in 1997 by Metro One, Inc., it possesses a musical style that was often compared to bands like Rage Against the Machine. It is a rap-rock fusion (also known as rapcore) with a highly spiritual message.

Track listing
"On Your Feet" – 2:50  	
"Eyes of a Blind Man" – 3:18
"Stupid People" – 1:59
"Face the Son" – 3:05
"Through Your Veins" – 4:25
"Louder" – 2:25
"Let Go" – 3:55
"Out of His Head" – 1:31
"Pride in His Face" – 3:05
"The Way You Want Me to Be" – 3:27
"Another Day" – 3:16
"Fear in His Eyes" – 2:38
"Think for Yourself" – 22:21

Notes
A faux live song appears as a hidden track 18 minutes into "Think For Yourself".
A re-recorded version "The Way You Want Me to Be" appears on the band's 2000 release, Echoes of the Spirit Still Dwell.
In an interview with Indievisionmusic.com in February 2013, Matt Baird said there are no plans to re-release the first three albums again.

References

Spoken (band) albums
1997 debut albums